Federico Baschirotto (born 20 September 1996) is a Italian professional footballer who plays as a defender for  club Lecce.

Club career
Baschirotto made his Serie C debut for Forlì on 27 August 2016 in a game against Venezia.

On 27 July 2021, he joined Serie B side Ascoli.

On 12 July 2022, he was signed by Lecce.

References

External links
 

Living people
1996 births
Sportspeople from the Province of Verona
Italian footballers
Footballers from Veneto
Association football defenders
U.S. Cremonese players
U.S. 1913 Seregno Calcio players
Forlì F.C. players
A.C. Cuneo 1905 players
U.S. Viterbese 1908 players
Ascoli Calcio 1898 F.C. players
U.S. Lecce players
Serie A players
Serie B players
Serie C players
Serie D players